The Archdiocese of Londrina is a Latin Church ecclesiastical jurisdiction or archdiocese of the Catholic Church in Paraná state, southern Brazil.

Its cathedral is Catedral Metropolitana Sagrado Coração de Jesus, dedicated to the Sacred Heart of Jesus, in the archiepiscopal see of Londrina.

History 
 February 1, 1956: Established as Diocese of Londrina on territory split off from the Diocese of Jacarezinho
 Lost territory on 1964.11.28 to establish Diocese of Apucarana, now its suffragan
 October 31, 1970: Promoted as Metropolitan Archdiocese of Londrina

Ecclesiastical province 
The Metropolitan has the following Suffragan sees :
 Roman Catholic Diocese of Apucarana, its daughter 
 Roman Catholic Diocese of Cornélio Procópio
 Roman Catholic Diocese of Jacarezinho

Statistics 
, it pastorally served 728,000 Catholics (73.4% of 992,000 total) on 6,714 km² in 76 parishes and 245 missions with 146 priests (75 diocesan, 71 religious), 59 deacons, 383 lay religious (145 brothers, 238 sisters) and 8 seminarians.

Ordinaries 

Suffragan Bishop of Londrina
 Geraldo Fernandes Bijos, Claretians (C.M.F.) (16 November 1956 – 31 October 1970 see below)

Metropolitan Archbishops of Londrina
 Geraldo Fernandes Bijos, C.M.F. (see above 31 October 1970 – 28 March death 1982), also Vice-President of National Conference of Bishops of Brazil (1974 – 1979)
 Auxiliary Bishop: Antônio Agostinho Marochi (1973.09.27 – 1976.02.02), Titular Bishop of Thabraca (1973.09.27 – 1976.02.02); later Bishop of Presidente Prudente (Brazil) (1976.02.02 – 2002.02.20)
 Auxiliary Bishop: Luiz Colussi (1978.01.03 – 1980.03.28), Titular Bishop of Gor (1978.01.03 – 1980.03.28); next Coadjutor Bishop of Lins (Brazil) (1980.03.28 – 1980.10.11), succeeding as Bishop of Lins (1980.10.11 – 1983.12.05), Bishop of Caçador (Brazil) (1983.12.05 – death 1996.12.04)
 Geraldo Majella Agnelo, (4 October 1982 – 16 September 1991); previously Bishop of Toledo (Brazil) (1978.05.05 – 1982.10.04); later Secretary of Congregation for Divine Worship and the Discipline of the Sacraments (1991.09.16 – 1999.01.13), Second Vice-President of Latin American Episcopal Council (1999 – 2003), Metropolitan Archbishop of São Salvador da Bahia (Brazil) (1999.01.13 – 2011.01.12), created Cardinal-Priest of S. Gregorio Magno alla Magliana Nuova (2001.02.21 [2001.05.20] – ...), President of National Conference of Bishops of Brazil (2003.05 – 2007.05)
 Albano Bortoletto Cavallin (11 March 1992 – retired 10 May 2006), died 2017; previously Titular Bishop of Aquæ novæ in Numidia (1973.06.14 – 1986.10.24) as Auxiliary Bishop of Archdiocese of Curitiba (Brazil) (1973.06.14 – 1986.10.24), Bishop of Guarapuava (Brazil) (1986.10.24 – 1992.03.11)
 Auxiliary Bishop: Vicente Costa (born Malta) (1998.07.01 – 2002.10.09), Titular Bishop of Aquæ flaviæ (1998.07.01 – 2002.10.09); next Bishop of Umuarama (Brazil) (2002.10.09 – 2009.12.30), Bishop of Jundiaí (Brazil) (2009.12.30 – ...)
 Auxiliary Bishop: José Lanza Neto (2004.06.23 – 2007.06.13), Titular Bishop of Mades (2004.06.23 – 2007.06.13); later Bishop of Guaxupé (Brazil) (2007.06.13 – ...)
 Orlando Brandes (10 May 2006 – 16 November 2016), previously Bishop of Joinville (Brazil) (1994.03.09 – 2006.05.10); next Metropolitan Archbishop of Aparecida (Brazil) (2016.11.16 – ...)
 Geremias Steinmetz (14 June 2017 – ...), previously Bishop of Paranavaí (Brazil) (2011.01.05 – 2017.06.14).

See also 
 List of Catholic dioceses in Brazil

Sources
 GCatholic.org, with Google map - data for all sections
 Archdiocese website (Portuguese)
 Catholic Hierarchy

Londrina
Roman Catholic dioceses in Brazil
Roman Catholic ecclesiastical provinces in Brazil

Religious organizations established in 1956
Roman Catholic dioceses and prelatures established in the 20th century